Probable tubulin polyglutamylase TTLL1 is an enzyme that in humans is encoded by the TTLL1 gene.

References

Further reading